Pierre Morel (born 10 September 1930) is a French former professional racing cyclist. He rode in the 1960 Tour de France.

References

External links
 

1930 births
Living people
French male cyclists